The discography of Australian rock group Hunters & Collectors consists of nine studio albums, thirty-three singles, three EPs, three live albums, and seven compilation albums.

Studio albums

Live albums

Compilation albums

EPs

Singles

Notes

References 

Discography
Rock music group discographies
Discographies of Australian artists